Prosper Magazine was a monthly publication that focused on business and lifestyle in the Sacramento area. The magazine was founded in 2004 by Warren Smith. The last issue was published in December 2007.

References

External links
 Official Website

2004 establishments in California
2007 disestablishments in California
Lifestyle magazines published in the United States
Monthly magazines published in the United States
Defunct magazines published in the United States
Local interest magazines published in the United States
Magazines established in 2004
Magazines disestablished in 2007
Magazines published in California
Mass media in Sacramento, California